Phyllomorpha lacerata is a species of coreid bug, and one of only two members of the genus Phyllomorpha.

References

External links
 

Phyllomorphini